Dacun is a railway station of Taiwan Railways Administration (TRA) West Coast line located in Dacun Township, Changhua County, Taiwan.

History
The station was opened on 4 April 2006.

See also
 List of railway stations in Taiwan

References 

2006 establishments in Taiwan
Railway stations in Changhua County
Railway stations opened in 2006
Railway stations served by Taiwan Railways Administration